Corporal George Ferrari (1845 – 1895?) was an American soldier in the U.S. Army who served with the 8th U.S. Cavalry during the Apache Wars. He was one of three men who were received the Medal of Honor for gallantry against the Apache Indians at Red Creek in the Arizona Territory on September 23, 1869. He was the first and only Italian-American to receive the award during the thirty-year period of the Indian Wars.

Biography
George Ferrari was born in New York City, New York in 1845. He later joined the U.S. Army in Cleveland, Ohio and was assigned to Company D of the 8th U.S. Cavalry. Ferrari was sent to the Arizona Territory where he took part in the Apache Wars in the late-1860s. On September 23, 1869, he and two other cavalry troopers, Private John Walker and Sergeant Charles Harris, were cited for "gallantry in action" against the Apache at Red Creek and received the Medal of Honor. Although he was the first and only Italian-American ever to receive the MOH during the Indian Wars, little of his life is known prior to and after leaving the military.

Medal of Honor citation
Rank and organization: Corporal, Company D, 8th U.S. Cavalry. Place and date: At Red Creek, Ariz., September 23, 1869. Entered service at: Montgomery County, Ohio. Birth: New York, N.Y. Date of issue: November 23, 1869.

Citation:

Gallantry in action.

See also

 List of Medal of Honor recipients for the Indian Wars

References

Further reading
 Konstantin, Phil. This Day in North American Indian History: Important Dates in the History of North America's Native Peoples for Every Calendar Day. New York: Da Capo Press, 2002. 

1845 births
1895 deaths
Year of death uncertain
American military personnel of the Indian Wars
United States Army Medal of Honor recipients
Military personnel from New York City
United States Army soldiers
American Indian Wars recipients of the Medal of Honor
American people of Italian descent